Marshallville is an unincorporated community and census-designated place (CDP) in Upper Township, Cape May County, New Jersey, United States. It is on the northern edge of the county, bordered to the north, across the Tuckahoe River, by Corbin City in Atlantic County. It is bordered to the east by the unincorporated community of Tuckahoe.

New Jersey Route 49 runs through Marshallville, having its eastern terminus in Tuckahoe and heading northwest  to Millville.

The community was first listed as a CDP prior to the 2020 census. The Marshallville Historic District is at the center of the community.

Demographics

References 

Census-designated places in Cape May County, New Jersey
Census-designated places in New Jersey
Upper Township, New Jersey